The Y Griega Station is a station on Line 1 of the Monterrey Metro, a light rail system in Monterrey, Mexico. The station was opened on 25 April 1991 as part of the inaugural section of Line 1, going from San Bernabé to Exposición.

This station is named after the Y-junction that Avenues Colón and Madero make, and its logo represents it in the form of a letter "Y".

The Y Griega station is a major transfer station as many buses that service communities off the Metropolitan area such as Pesquería connect to the Metro system at the Y Griega station. A bus line operated by the Nuevo Leon State Government called the Ruta Express (Express Route) operates from this station to the airport. The Y Griega station also serves the Fundidora Park.

This station is in the Acero neighborhood (Colonia Acero) and it is close to Parque Fundidora.

References 

Metrorrey stations
Railway stations opened in 1991
1991 establishments in Mexico